"Outa-Space" is an instrumental recorded by Billy Preston that originally appeared on his 1971 A&M Records-debut album, I Wrote a Simple Song. To create the primary instrumental sound, Preston played a clavinet through a wah wah pedal. The song was created by Preston improvising while calling out chord changes to the backing band. He later added organ and hand claps. Preston named the song "Outa-Space" for the instrumental's spacy sound.

While he thought it would be a hit, A&M was skeptical and issued it as the B-side of "I Wrote a Simple Song" in December 1971. However, radio DJs began flipping the single and, while "I Wrote a Simple Song" only reached #77 on the Billboard Hot 100, "Outa-Space" peaked at #2, showing that Preston's feelings about it were correct.

Chart performance
"Outa-Space" was kept out of the top spot by "Lean on Me" by Bill Withers. The instrumental also topped the R&B Singles chart for a week, succeeding the aforementioned "Lean on Me". The single was certified gold by the RIAA for sales of one million copies. In late 1972, "Outa-Space" peaked at #44 on the UK Singles Chart.

"Outa-Space" won the Grammy for Best Pop Instrumental Performance of 1972. Billboard ranked it as the #22 song for 1972.

Song in Pop Culture
In the 1990s, Intel Corporation used the song to promote their MMX-enabled Pentium processors.

References

1972 singles
Billy Preston songs
1970s instrumentals
Pop instrumentals
Songs written by Billy Preston
A&M Records singles
1972 songs
Cashbox number-one singles